Bill Kuisle (born January 11, 1958) is a Republican politician and farmer from Minnesota.

Kuisle earned an associate of arts degree from Rochester Community College and attended University of Wisconsin, River Falls. He graduated from Cardinal Stritch University with a degree in Business Management. He was a commissioner for Olmsted County before serving as a state legislator from 1996 to 2004. Jeff Johnson selected Kuisle as a running mate in his 2014 bid for Governor.

References

1958 births
Living people
Republican Party members of the Minnesota House of Representatives
Politicians from Rochester, Minnesota
21st-century American politicians